Holiday Man is the debut album by the American alternative rock band the Flys, released in 1998 by Trauma Records. The album spawned two singles, "Got You (Where I Want You)" and "She's So Huge", both of which charted on Billboard'''s Modern Rock Tracks chart.

Critical receptionThe Washington Post deemed the album "a little bit hip-hop and a whole lot rock-and-roll ... This is a band that could use a new attitude as much as fresh style." The Record'' thought that "the Flys would be wingless if it weren't for guitarist Peter Perdischizzi's inventive riffing and knack for strong melodies."

AllMusic wrote that the album "succeeds on inspired performances and their willingness to experiment with the standard alt-rock songwriting formula."

Track listing

Personnel
 Adam Paskowitz – vocals
 Joshua Paskowitz – vocals
 Peter Perdichizzi – guitar
 James Book – bass
 Nicky Lucero – drums

Charts

References

External links 
VH1 Artist Listing

1998 albums
The Flys (American band) albums
Trauma Records albums